Next Unit of Computing (NUC) is a line of small-form-factor barebone computer kits designed by Intel. It was previewed in 2012 and launched in early 2013. The NUC has developed over ten generations, spanning from Sandy Bridge-based Celeron CPUs in the first generation through Ivy Bridge-based Core i3 and i5 CPUs in the second generation to Gemini Lake-based Pentium and Celeron CPUs and Kaby Lake-based Core i3, i5, and i7 CPUs in the seventh and eighth generations.

The barebone kits consist of the board, in a plastic case with a fan, an external power supply, and a VESA mounting plate. Intel does sell just the NUC motherboards, which have a built-in CPU, although the price of a NUC motherboard is very close to the corresponding cased kit; third-party cases for the NUC boards are also available.

First generation

Sandy Bridge 
The first generation Intel NUC launched in the first quarter of 2013. This UCFF motherboard and system kit are codenamed Ski Lake (DCP847SK) and Deep Canyon (DCCP847DY) respectively.

Second generation

Ivy Bridge 
The base UCFF motherboard and kit without Thunderbolt or USB 3 are codenamed Golden Lake (D33217GK) and Ice Canyon (DC3217IY) respectively. The Thunderbolt capable UCFF motherboard and kit are codenamed Campers Lake (D33217CK) and Box Canyon (DC3217BY) respectively. The USB 3 capable UCFF motherboard and kit are codenamed Rend Lake (D53427RK) and Horse Canyon (DC53427HY) respectively.

The stripped-down DC3217BY model has a signature red top cover and no Ethernet. This model, while stocks were still available, generally sold for a deep discount. The absence of Ethernet may be mitigated by using a USB 2.0 to 10/100 fast Ethernet dongle based upon the Kawasaki LSI one-chip adapter (KL5KUSB102, for example), or a similar dongle based upon a Realtek chip; the Kawasaki Logic dongle requires a proprietary driver for macOS X, whereas the driver for the Realtek dongle is built into macOS X. The DC3217BY runs macOS X (10.9, and any of its updates) flawlessly as the processor's HD4000 is fully supported by macOS X.

Third generation

Bay Trail-M 
This UCFF motherboard (DN2820FYB) and system kit (DN2820FYKH) model were codenamed Forest Canyon. The DN2820FYKH product itself is mis-marked DN2820FYK, but the retail package, all retail documentation, and Intel's web site correctly identify this product as DN2820FYKH. The "H" indicates support for internal 2.5" media, SSD or HDD. There is no "non-H" version of this product as it does not include an on-board mSATA connector, hence media which is external to the board is mandatory, and hence the "H" version.

This product introduces for the first time a new 12V 3A "wall wart", in place of the traditional 19V 3.42A power brick and its "Mickey Mouse" AC power cord. Four region-specific plug-on adapters, including North America and three overseas countries, are included in the retail package.

These models shipped with the problematic BIOS revision 13, however this revision did not recognise most low voltage SO-DIMMs and would report as having zero capacity. Keyboard escapes for BIOS interfacing had been problematic, legacy booting was not supported, and it had been elected to only include UEFI booting. BIOS revision 48 has been released and resolved the problems, enabling the recognition of most low voltage SO-DIMMs, keyboard escapes and legacy booting.

Bay Trail-I 
This UCFF motherboard (DE3815TYB) and system kit (DE3815TYK) models were codenamed Thin Canyon.

Fourth generation

Haswell 

UCFF motherboard (D34010WYB and D54250WYB) and system kit (D34010WYK/D34010WYKH and D54250WYK/D54250WYKH) models were designated Wilson Canyon containing Haswell processors were revealed in June 2013.

Fifth generation

Broadwell-U 
In early 2015 a new generation of NUCs, powered by 5th generation Intel processors was released and in Q2 2015 the first NUC with Core i7 processor (NUC5i7RYH) would become available. The collection of 5th generation of NUCs include adaptive/smart performance technology and Turbo Boost Technology 2.0.

UCFF motherboard (NUC5i3RYB, NUC5i5RYB and NUC5i7RYB) and system kit (NUC5i5RYK/NUC5i3RYH, NUC5i5RYK/NUC5i5RYH and NUC5i7RYH) models were designated Rock Canyon. UCFF motherboard (NUC5i3MYBE and NUC5i5MYBE) and system kit (NUC5i3MYHE and NUC5i5MYHE) models were codenamed Maple Canyon.
In Q4 2018 and Q1 2019 two new SKUs of "Rock Canyon" - Refresh have been launched and become two of a few available models still supporting Windows* 7 (NUC5i3RYHSN and NUC5i5RYHS). These modes have updated CPU revisions and other minor changes.
All models include:
 Dual-channel DDR3L SO-DIMM, 1.35 V, 1333/1600 MHz, 16 GB maximum
 One Gigabit Ethernet port
 Internal support for M.2 (either B-Keyed Maple Canyon or M-Keyed Rock Canyon) 22×42, 22×60, and 22×80 SSD card supporting PCIe 2.0 (×1, ×2 and ×4) and SATA 6 Gbit/s
 Two USB 3.0 connectors on back panel
 Two USB 3.0 connectors on front panel
 Two internal USB 2.0 ports via header
 Up to 7.1 surround audio via mini HDMI and mini DisplayPort
 Headphone/microphone jack on the front panel

 Version 1.4a
 Version 1.2

Braswell 
These UCFF system kit (NUC5CPYH and NUC5PPYH) models, formerly known as Pinnacle Canyon, are based on 5th generation Celeron and Pentium-branded Braswell 14 nm processor family. There is also the UCFF complete system (NUC5PGYH) model, formerly known as Grass Canyon, which is based on 5th generation Pentium-branded Braswell 14 nm processor family and comes with 2 GB of RAM and 32 GB of eMMC with Windows 10 installed.

All models include:
 One memory channel DDR3L SO-DIMM (204-pin), 1.35 V, 1333/1600 MHz, 8 GB maximum
 One Gigabit Ethernet port
 802.11ac Wi-Fi (Intel Wireless-AC 3165) and Bluetooth 4.0
 Internal support for M.2 (E-Keyed) 22×30 wireless card supporting PCIe 2.0 ×1, and USB 2.0
 Two USB 3.0 connectors on back panel
 Two USB 3.0 connectors on front panel
 Two internal USB 2.0 ports via header
 Up to 7.1 surround audio via HDMI
 Headphone/microphone jack on the front panel
 Headphone/TOSLINK jack on the rear panel
 SDXC slot with UHS-I support on the side
 CIR Sensor
 According to the Intel Technical Product Specification, these models have fans.

Sixth generation

Skylake-U 
UCFF system kit (NUC6i3SYK/NUC6i3SYH and NUC6i5SYK/NUC6i5SYH) models were designated Swift Canyon, containing Skylake processors. UCFF system kit (NUC6i7KYK) models were codenamed Skull Canyon, containing Skylake processors. They were launched in Q4/2015, except for NUC6i7KYK, which was launched in Q2/2016.

All models include:
 Dual-channel DDR4 SO-DIMM, 1.2 V, 2133 MHz, 32 GB maximum
 One Gigabit Ethernet port
 Intel Dual Band Wireless-AC 8260 (802.11ac), 1×1, up to 867 Mbit/s
 Dual-mode Bluetooth 4.1
 Internal support for M.2 M-Keyed 22×42 and 22×80 SSD card supporting PCIe 3.0 (×1, ×2 and ×4) and SATA 6 Gbit/s
 SDXC slot with UHS-I support on the side
 Intel HD Graphics 540 video (580 for the NUC6i7KYK)
 Up to 7.1 surround audio via full-sized HDMI and mini DisplayPort
 Intel Wireless Display (Intel WiDi)
Skull Canyon models include:
 USB-C port supporting USB 3.1 Gen 2 (SuperSpeed+), Thunderbolt 3 and DisplayPort 1.2
 Internal support for a second M.2 M-Keyed 22×42 and 22×80 SSD card supporting PCIe 3.0 (×1, ×2 and ×4) and SATA 6 Gbit/s

Apollo Lake 
These UCFF system kit (NUC6CAYS and NUC6CAYH) models formerly known as Arches Canyon, are based on the 6th generation Celeron-branded Apollo Lake SoC 14 nm processor family. The main difference between the two systems are that NUC6CAYS adds 32GB of eMMC storage. They were launched in Q4/2016.
RAM: DDR3L-1600/1866 1.35V SO-DIMM

Seventh generation

Kaby Lake-U (Baby Canyon) 
Intel seventh generation NUC models, codenamed Baby Canyon, are based on their Kaby Lake-U processors. They were launched in Q1/2017 and Q2/2017.

Kaby Lake-U (Dawson Canyon) 
A refresh of the seventh generation NUC models, codenamed Dawson Canyon, saw a replacement of the USB 3.1 Type-C port with a second HDMI 2.0a port. This refresh also updated the CPU's in the i5 models while still using Kaby Lake-U processors, and the i7 models to Kaby Lake-R processors. The i3 models saw no change in the CPU. Intel Optane M.2 support remains, but no models with a preinstalled module were released. M.2 support was updated from a single 22×42/80 slot to dual 22×30 (key E) and 22×80 (key M) slots. They were launched in Q2/2017.

Kaby Lake-R (Dawson Canyon) 
They were launched in Q1/2018.

Gemini Lake (June Canyon) 
The UCFF system kit (NUC7PJYH and NUC7CJYH) models, codenamed June Canyon, based on 7th generation Pentium & Celeron-branded Gemini Lake SoC 14 nm processor family. They were launched in Q1/2018.

RAM: DDR4-2400 1.2V SO-DIMM.

Officially as stated in intel ark for NUC7PJYH model max memory size is 8GB. There have been reports of "over-ramming" to 16GB and 24GB without any problems while running in 24x7 environments. 
Max memory supported stated in BIOS dmidecode is: 
  Handle 0x0018, DMI type 16, 23 bytes
  Physical Memory Array
        Location: System Board Or Motherboard
        Use: System Memory
        Error Correction Type: None
        Maximum Capacity: 32 GB
        Error Information Handle: Not Provided
        Number Of Devices: 2

Eighth generation

Kaby Lake-G 
Intel eighth generation NUC models, codenamed Hades Canyon, is based on their Kaby Lake-G processors with a TDP from 65 W to 100 W. It features a custom AMD GPU, based on Vega and Polaris technologies. They were launched in Q1/2018.

Coffee Lake-U 
Intel eighth generation NUC models, codenamed Bean Canyon, is based on their Coffee Lake-U processors with a TDP of 28 W. They were launched in Q3/2018.

Cannon Lake-U 
Intel eighth generation NUC models, codenamed Crimson Canyon, is based on their 10 nm Cannon Lake-U processors. They come with Windows 10 Home x64 preinstalled along with a 1TB SATA3 HDD. They were launched in Q3/2018.

Whiskey Lake-U (Islay Canyon) 
Intel eighth generation NUC models, codenamed Islay Canyon, is based on their Whiskey Lake-U processors with a TDP of 15 W. They were launched in Q2/2019.

Whiskey Lake-U (Provo Canyon) 
Intel eighth generation NUC models, codenamed Provo Canyon and marketed as NUC 8 Pro, is based on their Whiskey Lake-U processors with a TDP of 15 W and optional vPro. They were launched in Q1/2020.

Apollo Lake 
Intel eighth generation NUC models, codenamed Chaco Canyon, is based on their Apollo Lake processors with a TDP of 15 W, and 64 GB of eMMC. The 4GB of RAM are soldered directly to the motherboard and are therefore non-upgradeable. 
They were launched in Q3/2019.

Intel NUC 8 Rugged specifications, first fanless NUC since 2014, was released in September 2019.

Ninth generation

Coffee Lake Refresh-H 

Intel ninth generation NUC models, codenamed Ghost Canyon and marketed as NUC 9 Extreme, is based on their Coffee Lake Refresh-H processors with a TDP of 45 W. They newly support an 8" desktop discrete graphic cards and a NUC compute element for CPU upgrades. They have a 5.0-liter case instead of the 0.67-liter case of most previous NUCs. They were launched in Q1/2020.

Xeon E-2200M / Coffee Lake Refresh-H 

Intel ninth generation NUC models, codenamed Quartz Canyon and marketed as NUC 9 Pro, is based on their Xeon E-2200M and Coffee Lake Refresh-H processors with a TDP of 45 W. They were launched in Q1/2020.

Tenth generation

Comet Lake-U 
Intel tenth generation NUC models, codenamed Frost Canyon and marketed as NUC 10 Performance, is based on their Comet Lake-U processors with a TDP of 25 W. They were launched in November 2019.

Eleventh generation

Tiger Lake-U 

Intel eleventh generation NUC models, codenamed Phantom Canyon and marketed as NUC 11 Enthusiast, is based on their Tiger Lake-U processors with a TDP from 150 W. It features an Nvidia GeForce RTX 2060 discrete GPU. They were launched on January 13, 2021.

Intel eleventh generation NUC models, codenamed Panther Canyon and marketed as NUC 11 Performance, is based on their Tiger Lake-U processors with a TDP of 40 W. They were launched on January 13, 2021.

Intel eleventh generation NUC models, codenamed Tiger Canyon and marketed as NUC 11 Pro, is based on their Tiger Lake-U processors with a TDP of 15 or 28 W. They were launched on first quarter 2021.

Jasper Lake (Atlas Canyon) 
The UCFF system kit (NUC11ATKPE and NUC11ATKC4) models, codenamed Atlas Canyon, based on Pentium Silver & Celeron-branded Jasper Lake SoC 10 nm processor family. They were launched in Q1/2022.

RAM: DDR4-2933 1.2V SO-DIMM.

Twelfth generation

Alder Lake 
Intel released its 12th generation NUC compute elements in Q1 2022, code named Eden Bay. The complete kit was code named Dragon Canyon. It uses 12th generation Intel CPUs. 12th generation also supports PCI Express Gen 5.

Intel twelfth generation NUC models, codenamed Wall Street Canyon and marketed as NUC 12 Pro, is based on their Alder Lake-P processors with a TDP of 35 W. They were launched on third quarter 2022.

Reception and ecosystem 
The NUC was seen by some reviewers as Intel's response to (or adoption of) the Apple Mac Mini format, although it is actually smaller, physically. Given its kit nature, other reviewers have seen it as a more powerful Raspberry Pi, particularly since the NUC boards could be bought without a case. The NUC can also be seen as an extension or continuation of Intel's earlier mobile-on-desktop (MoDT) initiative that was spearheaded by AOpen as early as 2004.

Most of the third-generation NUCs come in two case sizes, one with room for a 2.5-inch drive, and one without. The smaller case, although lacking room for a 2.5" drive, still has an internal SATA connector (including SATA power). Some larger third-party cases have appeared that can fit such drives.

The Intel case is actively cooled with a fan. Silent PC Review notes that “The original Intel NUC had "the distinction of being the quietest fan-cooled mini-computer we've come across." The NUC D54250WYK [Haswell-based], with the same cooling system, sounds exactly the same. In normal use, you can't hear the fan until your ear is inches from the unit.” Nevertheless, passively cooled third-party cases have appeared on the market as well.
Larger or metallic third-party cases also provide lower operating temperatures.

A review by the Tech Report of the pre-production 2012-vintage NUC found that the NUC would seize up after a few gigabytes were transferred over wireless and that the problem could be alleviated by better cooling of the NUC case. Intel later increased the default fan speed for production machines through a BIOS update (downloadable from Intel's web site for "early adopters").

Regarding power consumption, in their review of the D54250WYK with a Haswell i5-4250, Silent PC Review concluded that "An idle power level of just 6 W and typical use power barely into two digits is very impressive in one sense; in another sense, it's what you find in current Ultrabooks using similar components."

Other companies have subsequently adopted a form factor similar, but not identical, to Intel's NUC. For example, Gigabyte Technology launched their BRIX series, which attempts to differentiate itself using more powerful components, up to the i7-4770R processor, which embeds Intel Iris Pro Graphics.

Operating system support 

NUCs support UEFI compatible operating systems, such as Microsoft Windows, as well as most distributions of Linux. Additionally, they can be used for virtualization with VMware vSphere; multiple NUCs can be used together to create a home lab for learning purposes.

It is technically possible, with some limitations in functionality, to install an unauthorized copy of MacOS on a NUC, creating a "Hackintosh". The pre-Haswell Core i3 and Core i5 NUCs will run OS X 10.9 Mavericks well.

Skylake and Broadwell-based NUC is also a supported device in Google Fuchsia OS.

References

External links 
 Intel NUC

Intel products
Personal computing